Aastrup (Åstrup, in the post-1948 Danish orthography) is a Danish place name, which may refer to:

Aastrup, Falster, a village in eastern Falster
Aastrup Church, church in Aastrup, Falster
Aastrup (manor house), a manor house in Tølløse

See also
 Åstorp locality southern Sweden, whose old Danish name is Aastrup